Somadasys is a genus of moths in the family Lasiocampidae. The genus was erected by Max Gaede in 1932.

Species
Somadasys brevivenis
Somadasys catacoides (or Somadasys catocoides)
Somadasys daisensis
Somadasys kibunensis
Somadasys lunatus
Somadasys takamukui
Somadasys saturatus
Somadasys yatsugadakensis

References

External links

Lasiocampidae
Taxa named by Max Gaede
Moth genera